Stahlhofen am Wiesensee is an Ortsgemeinde – a community belonging to a Verbandsgemeinde – in the Westerwaldkreis in Rhineland-Palatinate, Germany. It is not to be confused with Stahlhofen, another community in the same district, but in the Verbandsgemeinde of Montabaur.

Geography

Location
Stahlhofen am Wiesensee lies 3 km northeast of Westerburg, on a bank near the Wiesensee's west shore. Since 1972 it has belonged to what was then the newly founded Verbandsgemeinde of Westerburg, a kind of collective municipality. Its seat is in the like-named town.

Neighbouring communities
Stahlhofen am Wiesensee's neighbours are Pottum, Hergenroth, Winnen and Halbs.

Politics

The municipal council is made up of 9 council members, including the extraofficial mayor (Bürgermeister), who were elected in a majority vote in a municipal election on 13 June 2004.

Culture and sightseeing

Buildings
The old village school from 1830 is a protected monument.

Sport
The Wiesensee (lake) has an area of roughly 80 ha and offers not only hikes around it but also bathing, sailing, surfing and angling. Near the lake is also found a golf course.

Economy and infrastructure

North of the community runs Bundesstraße 255, linking Montabaur and Herborn. The nearest Autobahn interchange is Montabaur on the A 3 (Cologne–Frankfurt), some 20 km away. The nearest InterCityExpress stop is the railway station at Montabaur on the Cologne-Frankfurt high-speed rail line.

References

External links
Stahlhofen am Wiesensee 

Municipalities in Rhineland-Palatinate
Westerwaldkreis